The 1939 Colgate Red Raiders football team was an American football team that represented Colgate University as an independent during the 1939 college football season. In its 11th season under head coach Andrew Kerr, the team compiled a 2–5–1 record and was outscored by a total of 92 to 66. Ernest Neill was the team captain. 

The team played its home games at the newly-constructed Colgate Athletic Field, later renamed Andy Kerr Stadium, in Hamilton, New York. The first game at the new facility was played against NYU on September 30, 1939. Colgate's first victory at the new stadium was on October 14, 1939, against Brown.

Schedule

References

Colgate
Colgate Raiders football seasons
Colgate football